Walter Batty  (1 January 1905 – 10 May 1979) was a New Zealand rugby union player. A loose forward, Batty represented  at a provincial level, and was a member of the New Zealand national side, the All Blacks, from 1928 to 1931. He played six matches for the All Blacks including four internationals.

Batty was born in Tonga in 1905, to an English father and a Tongan mother. He was educated at Auckland Grammar School, and was an insurance agent when he enlisted for service during World War II. He saw active service in North Africa and Italy with the 6th New Zealand Field Regiment, and won the Distinguished Conduct Medal during Operation Crusader for actions on 1 December 1941 at Belhamed in Libya.

References

1905 births
1979 deaths
Tongan emigrants to New Zealand
New Zealand people of English descent
People educated at Auckland Grammar School
New Zealand rugby union players
New Zealand international rugby union players
Auckland rugby union players
New Zealand military personnel of World War II
New Zealand recipients of the Distinguished Conduct Medal
Rugby union number eights